Silsila Hai Pyar Ka is a 1999 Hindi romance film directed by Shrabani Deodhar and starring Karishma Kapoor, Chandrachur Singh and Danny Denzongpa. The cast includes Shakti Kapoor, Alok Nath, Johnny Lever, Aruna Irani, Tiku Talsania, Dina Pathak, Nilam Singh, Mishkaa Khanna and Ali Haider.

Plot

Vanshika Mathur (Karishma Kapoor), an orphan who lives with her aunt (Aruna Irani), is a simple middle-class girl desperately in search of a job. Eventually she gets a job with Mr. Sinha (Alok Nath), a very successful businessman. Mr. Sinha is a widower who has a son Abhay (Chandrachur Singh). Abhay has grown up with his maternal uncle, Rakesh (Shakti Kapoor), a four-time divorce, whose motto is "Stay unmarried and lead a Bohemian lifestyle". Abhay is strongly influenced by his uncle and has grown into a flamboyant, arrogant, spoilt brat who has never put in a day's work at the family business. Mr. Sinha is obviously perturbed to the point of distress by the lifestyle his son leads - partying all night and sleeping through the day. He is determined to get his son back on the right track. In order to get Abhay into the office, he entices him with the idea of a young female secretary. He succeeds. Abhay meets Vanshika at the office. He is disgusted. She is flustered, but hopelessly in love. The rest of the film is a roller-coaster ride - a clash of the value system of the idealistic Vanshika and the non-existent morals of the wayward Abhay. But there are some unexpected twists, strange encounters (with Jabbar Khashogi-Danny Denzongpa) and unusual events courtesy of Johnny Lever on this exciting ride. Will Vanshika win Abhay over? Yet again, will love triumph against all odds? and of course it does.

Soundtrack

All songs are composed by Jatin-Lalit and penned by Sameer.

External links 
 

1999 films
1990s Hindi-language films
Films scored by Jatin–Lalit
Indian romance films
Films directed by Shrabani Deodhar
1990s romance films
Hindi-language romance films